Beati may refer to:

 Aap Beati, a 1976 Hindi film
 Beati, those who have undergone the process of beatification
 Beati Paoli, the name of a secretive sect thought to have existed in medieval Sicily
 Nicola Beati (born 1983), Italian football (soccer) player

See also 

 beati, Wiktionary definition